Drymobius margaritiferus, commonly known as the speckled racer, is a species of nonvenomous colubrid snake native to the Americas. The specific name, margaritiferus, means "pearl-bearing" in Latin, referring to the pearl-like spots on the dorsal scales.

Geographic range and habitat
This species ranges throughout Central America from the Isthmus of Tehuantepec and Yucatán Peninsula southward to Panama and adjacent areas of northwest Colombia, occurring at elevations from sea level up to 4,750 feet (1,453 m.). Northward it is found in the coastal lowlands and lower exterior slopes of the Sierra Madres of Mexico, up the west coast to Sonora, and up the east coast to northern Tamaulipas. The northern limit of its distribution ranges into extreme south Texas, USA where it is uncommon to rare in a few of the southernmost counties of the state.

It occurs in a wide variety of habitats, including forest, forest edges and clearings, secondary growth, riparian zones,  savannahs, marshlands, pastures, and roadsides. It is often said to favor humid and wet areas with permanent water sources however, these snakes have been found in areas where no water was apparent and habitats include tropical dry forest and tropical arid forest, In Costa Rica it is described as " ubiquitous in all but the most humid lowland and pre-montane zones" including dry lowland forest.

Description

The speckled racer is typically black in color with distinctive yellow and blue spotting, one light-colored spot on each scale, which gives the snake an overall greenish hue. The labials are yellow, with black sutures. The underside is typically yellow to green. They average 30–40 in. (76–102 cm) in length, record 50 in. (127 cm).

The dorsal scales, which are feebly keeled middorsally, but smooth on the flanks, are arranged in 17 rows. The ventrals number 142-168; the subcaudals, 85-126.

Natural history
As the name "racer" implies, it is a fast, agile, and predominantly a diurnal species. It has been described as a nervous species and will not hesitate to bite in self defensive when restrained or handled. 
Death feigning behavior, or thanatosis, was reported for two out of seven (28.5%) specimens that were caught and handled during field surveys conducted in Tamaulipas, Mexico.

They will consume a wide variety of prey, but primarily feed on frogs and toads. One study of 36 Guatemalan and Mexican specimens with food items in their stomachs found 86%  had anurans (predominantly Eleutherodactylus), 8% lizards, 4% reptiles eggs, and 2% small mammals. Juveniles are known to eat insects.

They are oviparous typically laying eggs in the spring, although in southern areas it is known to deposit eggs as early as February and March. Clutch size range from two to eight eggs that are usually 1.5 inches (3.8 cm.) in length. Incubation is typically eight to nine weeks with hatchling measuring six to ten and a half inches  (15.2-27.6 cm.) long.

Subspecies
There are four recognized subspecies of D. margaritiferus:

 Drymobius m. margaritiferus (Schlegel, 1837), Northern speckled racer: Atlantic versant, Texas to Colombia and sections of Pacific in Chiapas, Mexico and southern range.
 Drymobius m. fistulosus H.M. Smith, 1942 Central American speckled racer: Pacific versant from southern Sonora to the Isthmus of Tehuantepec.
 Drymobius m. occidentalis Bocourt, 1890 Western speckled racer: Pacific versant from eastern Chiapas, Mexico to El Salvador.
 Drymobius m. maydis Villa, 1968 Corn Islands, Nicaragua.

Conservation status
The speckled racer is a threatened species in the state of Texas, USA where it is uncommon to rare. In some regions of Mexico and Central America it is a common species.

References

Further reading
 Schlegel, H. (1837). Essai sur la physionomie des serpens. Amsterdam: M.H. Schonekat. Partie Générale. xxviii + 251 pp. (Herpetodryas margaritiferus, p. 151.) AND Partie Descriptive. 606 + xvi pp. (Herpetodryas margaritiferus, pp. 184–185.)

External links

Colubrids
Reptiles described in 1837
Reptiles of Central America
Reptiles of Mexico
Fauna of the Rio Grande valleys
Reptiles of Guatemala
Reptiles of Colombia